Fractional calculus is a branch of mathematical analysis that studies the several different possibilities of defining real number powers or complex number powers of the differentiation operator  

and of the integration operator  

and developing a calculus for such operators generalizing the classical one.

For example, one may ask for a meaningful interpretation of

as an analogue of the functional square root for the differentiation operator, that is, an expression for some linear operator that, when applied twice to any function, will have the same effect as differentiation. More generally, one can look at the question of defining a linear operator

for every real number  in such a way that, when  takes an integer value , it coincides with the usual -fold differentiation  if , and with the -th power of  when .

Fractional differential equations, also known as extraordinary differential equations, are a generalization of differential equations through the application of fractional calculus.

Historical notes
In applied mathematics and mathematical analysis, a fractional derivative is a derivative of any arbitrary order, real or complex. Its first appearance is in a letter written to Guillaume de l'Hôpital by Gottfried Wilhelm Leibniz in 1695.  Around the same time, Leibniz wrote to one of the Bernoulli brothers describing the similarity between the binomial theorem and the Leibniz rule for the fractional derivative of a product of two functions.  Fractional calculus was introduced in one of Niels Henrik Abel's early papers where all the elements can be found: the idea of fractional-order integration and differentiation, the mutually inverse relationship between them, the understanding that fractional-order differentiation and integration can be considered as the same generalized operation, and even the unified notation for differentiation and integration of arbitrary real order.
Independently, the foundations of the subject were laid by Liouville in a paper from 1832.
The autodidact Oliver Heaviside introduced the practical use of fractional differential operators in electrical transmission line analysis circa 1890. The theory and applications of fractional calculus expanded greatly over the 19th and 20th centuries, and numerous contributors have given different definitions for fractional derivatives and integrals.

Nature of the fractional derivative
The -th derivative of a function  at a point  is a local property only when  is an integer; this is not the case for non-integer power derivatives. Therefore, it is expected that the fractional derivative operation involves some sort of boundary conditions, involving information on the function further out.

The fractional derivative of a function of order  is nowadays often defined by means of the Fourier or Mellin integral transforms.

Heuristics
A fairly natural question to ask is whether there exists a linear operator , or half-derivative, such that

It turns out that there is such an operator, and indeed for any , there exists an operator  such that

Call this

Repeating this process gives

and this can be extended arbitrarily.

The Cauchy formula for repeated integration, namely

leads in a straightforward way to a generalization for real .

Using the gamma function to remove the discrete nature of the factorial function gives us a natural candidate for fractional applications of the integral operator.

This is in fact a well-defined operator.

It is straightforward to show that the  operator satisfies

This relationship is called the semigroup property of fractional differintegral operators. Unfortunately, the comparable process for the derivative operator  is significantly more complex, but it can be shown that  is neither commutative nor additive in general.

Fractional integrals

Riemann–Liouville fractional integral
The classical form of fractional calculus is given by the Riemann–Liouville integral, which is essentially what has been described above. The theory of fractional integration for periodic functions (therefore including the "boundary condition" of repeating after a period) is given by the Weyl integral. It is defined on Fourier series, and requires the constant Fourier coefficient to vanish (thus, it applies to functions on the unit circle whose integrals evaluate to zero). The Riemann–Liouville integral exists in two forms, upper and lower. Considering the interval , the integrals are defined as

By contrast the Grünwald–Letnikov derivative starts with the derivative instead of the integral.

Hadamard fractional integral
The Hadamard fractional integral was introduced by Jacques Hadamard and is given by the following formula,

Atangana–Baleanu fractional integral
The Atangana–Baleanu fractional integral of a continuous function is defined as:

Fractional derivatives

Unlike classical Newtonian derivatives, fractional derivatives can be defined in a variety of different ways that often do not all lead to the same result even for smooth functions. Some of these are defined via a fractional integral. Because of the incompatibility of definitions, it is frequently necessary to be explicit about which definition is used.

Riemann–Liouville fractional derivative
The corresponding derivative is calculated using Lagrange's rule for differential operators. Computing th order derivative over the integral of order , the  order derivative is obtained. Similar to the definitions for the Riemann–Liouville integral, the derivative has upper and lower variants.

Caputo fractional derivative
Another option for computing fractional derivatives is the Caputo fractional derivative. It was introduced by Michele Caputo in his 1967 paper. In contrast to the Riemann–Liouville fractional derivative, when solving differential equations using Caputo's definition, it is not necessary to define the fractional order initial conditions. Caputo's definition is illustrated as follows, where again :

There is the Caputo fractional derivative defined as:

which has the advantage that is zero when  is constant and its Laplace Transform is expressed by means of the initial values of the function and its derivative. Moreover, there is the Caputo fractional derivative of distributed order defined as

where  is a weight function and which is used to represent mathematically the presence of multiple memory formalisms.

Caputo–Fabrizio fractional derivative
In a paper of 2015, M. Caputo and M. Fabrizio presented a definition of fractional derivative with a non singular kernel, for a function  of  given by:

where

Atangana–Baleanu fractional derivative
In 2016, Atangana and Baleanu suggested differential operators based on the generalized Mittag-Leffler function. The aim was to introduce fractional differential operators with non-singular nonlocal kernel. Their fractional differential operators are given below in Riemann–Liouville sense and Caputo sense respectively. For a function  of  given by 

If the function is continuous, the Atangana–Baleanu derivative in Riemann–Liouville sense is given by:

Therefore, we have that, the function  is the cumulative distribution function of a probability measure on the positive real numbers. The distribution is therefore defined, and any of its multiples, is called a Mittag-Leffler distribution of order . It is also very well-known that, all these probability distributions are absolutely continuous. In particular, the function Mittag-Leffler has a particular case , which is the exponential function, the Mittag-Leffler distribution of order  is therefore an exponential distribution. Their Laplace transform is given by:

In addition, these distributions are geometric stable distributions.

Riesz derivative
The Riesz derivative is defined as

where  denotes the Fourier transform.

Other types
Classical fractional derivatives include:
 Grünwald–Letnikov derivative
 Sonin–Letnikov derivative
 Liouville derivative
 Caputo derivative
 Hadamard derivative
 Marchaud derivative
 Riesz derivative
 Miller–Ross derivative
 Weyl derivative
 Erdélyi–Kober derivative
 -derivative
New fractional derivatives include:
 Coimbra derivative
 Katugampola derivative
 Hilfer derivative
 Davidson derivative
 Chen derivative
 Caputo Fabrizio derivative
 Atangana–Baleanu derivative

Generalizations

Erdélyi–Kober operator
The Erdélyi–Kober operator is an integral operator introduced by Arthur Erdélyi (1940). and Hermann Kober (1940) and is given by

which generalizes the Riemann–Liouville fractional integral and the Weyl integral.

Functional calculus
In the context of functional analysis, functions  more general than powers are studied in the functional calculus of spectral theory. The operators arising are examples of singular integral operators; and the generalisation of the classical theory to higher dimensions is called the theory of Riesz potentials. So there are a number of contemporary theories available, within which fractional calculus can be discussed. See also Erdélyi–Kober operator, important in special function theory , .

Applications

Fractional conservation of mass
As described by Wheatcraft and Meerschaert (2008), a fractional conservation of mass equation is needed to model fluid flow when the control volume is not large enough compared to the scale of heterogeneity and when the flux within the control volume is non-linear. In the referenced paper, the fractional conservation of mass equation for fluid flow is:

Electrochemical analysis

When studying the redox behavior of a substrate in solution, a voltage is applied at an electrode surface to force electron transfer between electrode and substrate. The resulting electron transfer is measured as a current. The current depends upon the concentration of substrate at the electrode surface. As substrate is consumed, fresh substrate diffuses to the electrode as described by Fick's laws of diffusion. Taking the Laplace transform of Fick's second law yields an ordinary second-order differential equation (here in dimensionless form):

whose solution C(x,s) contains a one-half power dependence on s. Taking the derivative of C(x,s) and then the inverse Laplace transform yields the following relationship:

which relates the concentration of substrate at the electrode surface to the current. This relationship is applied in electrochemical kinetics to elucidate mechanistic behavior. For example, it has been used to study the rate of dimerization of substrates upon electrochemical reduction.

Groundwater flow problem
In 2013–2014 Atangana et al. described some groundwater flow problems using the concept of a derivative with fractional order. In these works, the classical Darcy law is generalized by regarding the water flow as a function of a non-integer order derivative of the piezometric head. This generalized law and the law of conservation of mass are then used to derive a new equation for groundwater flow.

Fractional advection dispersion equation
This equation has been shown useful for modeling contaminant flow in heterogenous porous media.

Atangana and Kilicman extended the fractional advection dispersion equation to a variable order equation. In their work, the hydrodynamic dispersion equation was generalized using the concept of a variational order derivative. The modified equation was numerically solved via the Crank–Nicolson method. The stability and convergence in numerical simulations showed that the modified equation is more reliable in predicting the movement of pollution in deformable aquifers than equations with constant fractional and integer derivatives

Time-space fractional diffusion equation models
Anomalous diffusion processes in complex media can be well characterized by using fractional-order diffusion equation models. The time derivative term corresponds to long-time heavy tail decay and the spatial derivative for diffusion nonlocality. The time-space fractional diffusion governing equation can be written as

Its applications in anomalous diffusion modeling can be found in the reference.

Structural damping models
Fractional derivatives are used to model viscoelastic damping in certain types of materials like polymers.

PID controllers
Generalizing PID controllers to use fractional orders can increase their degree of freedom. The new equation relating the control variable  in terms of a measured error value  can be written as

Acoustic wave equations for complex media
The propagation of acoustical waves in complex media, such as in biological tissue, commonly implies attenuation obeying a frequency power-law. This kind of phenomenon may be described using a causal wave equation which incorporates fractional time derivatives:

See also Holm & Näsholm (2011) and the references therein. Such models are linked to the commonly recognized hypothesis that multiple relaxation phenomena give rise to the attenuation measured in complex media. This link is further described in Näsholm & Holm (2011b) and in the survey paper, as well as the Acoustic attenuation article. See Holm & Nasholm (2013) for a paper which compares fractional wave equations which model power-law attenuation. This book on power-law attenuation also covers the topic in more detail.

Pandey and Holm gave a physical meaning to fractional differential equations by deriving them from physical principles and interpreting the fractional-order in terms of the parameters of the acoustical media, example in fluid-saturated granular unconsolidated marine sediments. Interestingly, Pandey and Holm derived Lomnitz's law in seismology and Nutting's law in non-Newtonian rheology using the framework of fractional calculus. Nutting's law was used to model the wave propagation in marine sediments using fractional derivatives.

Fractional Schrödinger equation in quantum theory
The fractional Schrödinger equation, a fundamental equation of fractional quantum mechanics, has the following form:

The potential energy function  depends on the system.

The index  in the fractional Schrödinger equation is the Lévy index, .

Variable-order fractional Schrödinger equation
As a natural generalization of the fractional Schrödinger equation, the variable-order fractional Schrödinger equation has been exploited to study fractional quantum phenomena:

where  is the Laplace operator and the operator  is the variable-order fractional quantum Riesz derivative.

See also
 Acoustic attenuation
 Autoregressive fractionally integrated moving average
 Initialized fractional calculus
 Nonlocal operator

Other fractional theories
 Fractional-order system
 Fractional Fourier transform

Notes

References

Further reading

Articles regarding the history of fractional calculus

Books

External links

 From MathWorld:
 
 
 
 
 Specialized journals
Fractional Calculus and Applied Analysis 1998–2014
Fractional Calculus and Applied Analysis  2015—
Fractional Differential Calculus (FDC)  2011–
Communications in Fractional Calculus 
Journal of Fractional Calculus and Applications (JFCA)  2011—
 
 
  collection of books, articles, preprints, etc.
 
 
 Fractional Calculus Modelling
 Introductory Notes on Fractional Calculus
 Power Law & Fractional Dynamics
 The CRONE Toolbox, a Matlab and Simulink Toolbox dedicated to fractional calculus, which is freely downloadable
 
 

 
Generalizations